Cancelloceras is an extinct genus of ammonites in the family Gastrioceratidae. Species are from the Carboniferous.

†Cancelloceras elegans Ruzhentsev and Bogoslovskaya 1978 is from the Carboniferous of the Russian Federation, Nevada (United States) and Uzbekistan.

See also 
 List of ammonite genera

References

External links 

 
 
 

Goniatitida genera
Gastrioceratidae
Carboniferous ammonites